The July 1, 1961, race at Lime Rock Park was the seventh racing event of the eleventh season of the Sports Car Club of America's 1961 Championship Racing Series.

SCCA National Lime Rock [AP+BP] Results

References

External links
Etceterini.com
RacingSportsCars.com
Dick Lang Racing History

Lime Rock